Thomas B. Huger (died April 25, 1862) was an officer in the Confederate States Navy during the U.S. Civil War. Before the war, he had served for over 20 years in the United States Navy.

Biography
Huger was born in South Carolina. He joined the U.S. Navy as a midshipman in March 1835. In 1845 he married Mariamne Williams Meade, the daughter of merchant Richard W. Meade and sister of Civil War general George Meade; she died in 1857. Huger was promoted to the rank of Lieutenant in February 1848 and continued in the service until his native state seceded from the United States. Resigning his commission in the U.S. Navy in January 1861, he became a First Lieutenant in the Confederate Navy the following March.

He commanded a battery on Morris Island, South Carolina in 1861 and was appointed as commanding officer of the gunboat CSS McRae later in that year. Huger's ship operated in defense of New Orleans, Louisiana and the lower Mississippi River. 

On April 24, 1862, while battling Federal Navy ships near Fort Jackson and Fort St. Philip, McRae was badly damaged and Lieutenant Huger was mortally wounded. He died the next day.

References
This page incorporates text from the public domain U.S. Naval Historical Center.

Year of birth missing
1862 deaths
Confederate States Navy officers
People from South Carolina
United States Navy officers
Confederate States of America military personnel killed in the American Civil War